On 20 February 2019, a fire broke out in Dhaka, Bangladesh. The fire started in a road accident between a pickup van and a private car. After the collision, the car's gas cylinder exploded. The fire then spread to a group of buildings being used to store chemicals, and quickly expanded to nearby buildings in the densely packed historic district of Chowk Bazaar in Old Dhaka. The fire left at least 80 people dead and 50 others injured.

Cause
The fire was reported to have originated in the explosion of a cylinder of compressed natural gas in a vehicle, which quickly triggered further fires in buildings and nearby gas cylinders. The blaze was first reported at 22:38, and was reported to be under control by about 03:00.

The first building to burn housed shops and a warehouse storing plastic goods, cosmetics and perfume on the first floor, with residential housing on upper stories. It spread to the four-storey building behind the Shahi Mosque. From that building, the fire spread to Rajmoni Restaurant and three other buildings in the narrow alley.

An electric transformer exploded just after the fire broke out, which demolished several cars parked on the alley. The alley was full of people because of a wedding ceremony in a nearby community centre.

Casualties
As of 21 February 2019, the death toll was estimated to be at least 80. In addition to those killed, at least 50 people were injured and transported to hospitals with severe burns and lung damage.

Reactions
Abdul Hamid, the President of Bangladesh, and Sheikh Hasina, the Prime Minister of Bangladesh, offered their condolences to the victims of the fire, as did Jatiya Party Chairman HM Ershad and many others.

In the aftermath of the fire, Dhaka South City Corporation Mayor Sayeed Khokon said chemical warehouses would no longer be permitted in the city.

Pakistan's Foreign Office Spokesperson expressed deep regret.

The United States embassy in Dhaka offered its condolences to the victims of the fire via Twitter.

Financial assistance

See also 
2010 Dhaka fire
2012 Dhaka fire
FR Tower fire

References 

2019 disasters in Bangladesh
2019 fires in Asia
2019 road incidents
February 2019 fire
2010s road incidents in Asia
Building and structure fires in Asia
Explosions in 2019
February 2019 fire
February 2019 events in Bangladesh
February 2019
Restaurant fires
Road incidents in Bangladesh
Warehouse fires
Residential building fires